National Highway 227J, commonly referred to as NH 227J is a national highway in India. It is a secondary route of National Highway 27.  NH-227J runs in the state of Bihar in India.

Route 
NH227J connects Saharghat, Uchhait, Benipatti and Rahika in the state of Bihar.

Junctions  
 
  Terminal near Saharghat.
  Terminal near Rahika.

See also 
 List of National Highways in India
 List of National Highways in India by state

References

External links 

 NH 227J on OpenStreetMap

National highways in India
National Highways in Bihar